The Creative Coalition is a nonprofit, (501(c)(3)) advocacy group formed of members of the American entertainment industry. The organization was founded in 1989 by Ron Silver. Tim Daly serves as the organization's president. Members have included Christopher Reeve, Ron Reagan, Blair Brown, Michael J. Fuchs, Alec Baldwin, Joe Pantoliano, Stephen Collins, and Wayne Knight. The coalition addresses both industry related issues, as well as general social issues.  The group educates leaders in the arts community on issues of public importance, specifically in the areas of First Amendment rights, arts advocacy and public education.

The group has sponsored benefit galas at both Democratic and Republican conventions, raising nearly $1.8 million during the 2004 presidential campaign. It does not contribute to political campaigns directly, instead employing lobbying firm Quinn Gillespie & Associates to advance its interest in Washington.

References

External links

Lobbying expenditures by Creative Coalition Overview at OpenSecrets.org
Creative Coalition Dinner with Joe Pantoliano video
The Creative Coalition and Liberated Artists present a panel discussion on Adam Rifkin’s “Look” at 2007 AFI Fest

Political organizations based in the United States